Johannes Schreiter (born 8 March 1930) is a German graphic artist, printmaker, designer of stained glass, theoretician and cultural critic. Born in Buchholz in 1930, Schreiter studied in Munster, Mainz, and Berlin, before receiving a scholarship from Friedrich-Ebert-Stiftung in 1958. His invention of the Brandcollage in 1959 first brought him to broader cultural attention, and in 1963 he became professor of Painting and Graphic Art at the Frankfurt/Main School of Decorative Arts, and later Rector of the same. He was awarded the Bundesverdienstkreuze (National Cross of Merit), the highest civilian honour granted by West Germany, in 1979.

Part of the influential Post-War German school of stained glass, Schreiter's work is characterised by the exploitation of lead as a graphic rather than solely structural element; the use of translucent, unpainted glass; and by a highly-developed and personal language of symbols. Regarded as occupying a position of pre-eminence in the stained glass of the 20th century, works by Schreiter can be found in historical and contemporary buildings, museums, and public and private art collections worldwide.

Early life

The 'Heidelberger Fensterstreit'
In 1977, Schreiter was commissioned to design a series of stained glass windows for the medieval Church of the Holy Spirit, Heidelberg, whose board had voted to replace 19th century temporary glazing and other additions to the building, one of the most significant Gothic churches in Germany, as part of a broader restoration and repair of the interior. Between 1977 and 1984, Schreiter designed a programme of artworks, twenty-two windows, for the Church, whose intention was to reinstall stained glass throughout in a unified programme of glazing by a single artist: the commission was what would have the largest stained glass commission granted to a single artist at that time. Considered one of the most significant works of stained glass of the 20th century, Schreiter's avant-garde designs incorporated references from science, medicine, philosophy, and the analogue technologies of the day in reference to Heiliggeistkirche's history as former home of the Biblioteca Palatina. Cited as the first time in contemporary stained glass design "that maps, graphs, newspaper and television images were used as source material", the windows were the subject of a dispute, cited as "the most intense controversy on record involving twentieth century stained glass". This major cultural and theological dispute, known as the 'Heidelberg Controversy', was concluded in 1986. In 1984, Schreiter's designs, previously argued out and tested within a working group including theologians, art critics and church attendees, were presented to the public, and the first of the designs was fabricated and installed in the Church: a window known as the "Physikfenster", marking the use of nuclear weapons at Hiroshima. The rector of Heidelberg University 'forbade the use' of these designs and, nine years after embarking on the programme, the project was terminated on June 23, 1986, with only one of the suite of twenty-two windows fabricated and installed. Several  individual windows from the cycle have since been fabricated, their creation from the original designs, under Schreiter's instruction, commissioned  by independent organisations, including museums, hospital clinics, and other churches.

Selected publications 
 Hans Hofstätter: Johannes Schreiter: Neue Glasbilder und eine Einführung in die neue Glasbildkunst. München: Moos, 1965.
 Birgit Schwarz: Johannes Schreiter: Das Glasbildernische Werk 1959-1980. Hessisches Landesmuseum Darmstadt, 1987. 
 Caroline Swash: Medical Science and Stained Glass: The Johannes Schreiter Windows at the Medical Library, the Royal London Hospital, Whitechapel. Malvern Arts Press, 2002. 
 Luzia Schlösser: Licht Zeichen: Die Kunst von Johannes Schreiter. Deutsches Glasmalerei-Museum Linnich, 2019. 
 Johannes Schreiter: Wortfenster. Schnell & Steiner, Regensburg 2008, ISBN 978-3-7954-2066-6.
 Yvonne Besser: Religiöse Bildsprache der nichtfigurativen Moderne: der Fensterzyklus zu Psalm 22 von Johannes Schreiter in der Jacobikirche Göttingen. Verlag Otto Lembeck, 2009.
 Gunther Sehring, Holger Brülls: Johannes Schreiter: Glasbilder – Collagen – Zeichnungen 1995–2012. Kunstverlag Josef Fink, Lindenberg 2012, ISBN 978-3-89870-687-2.
 Birgit Schwarz: Johannes Schreiter. Das glasbildnerische Werk von 1959 bis 1980. Hessisches Landesmuseum, Darmstadt, 1987.
 Helmut Schwier: Der Fensterzyklus von Johannes Schreiter in der Peterskirche Heidelberg (Schnell Kunstführer Nr. 2826). Schnell & Steiner, Regensburg 2013, ISBN 978-3-7954-6955-9.
 Hans Gerke: Die Heidelberger Fensterentwürfe von Johannes Schreiter. Wunderhorn, 1987.

Gallery

References

External links 

 Der Künstler Johannes Schreiter Neue Stadthalle Langen

1930 births
Living people
20th-century German painters
20th-century German male artists
21st-century German painters
21st-century German male artists
People from Annaberg-Buchholz
German contemporary artists
German male painters
German printmakers
German stained glass artists and manufacturers
German glass artists
Mixed-media artists